"You Can Get It" is a song by German Eurodance project Maxx, released in September 1994 as the third single from their debut album, To the Maxximum (1994). The single peaked at number 21 in the United Kingdom, number 19 on the UK Dance Singles Chart, and number 13 in Finland. On the Eurochart Hot 100, "You Can Get It" reached number 31. The accompanying music video was filmed at Hotel Gellért, a spa hotel located in Budapest, Hungary.

Critical reception
James Hamilton from Music Week'''s RM'' Dance Update described "You Can Get It" as a "catchy girls chanted and ragga guy rapped thunderous almost jungle tempo though cheesy 145.7 bpm Euro pounder".

Track listing

Personnel
 Cover artwork – I-D Büro
 Lyrics – Dakota O'Neil, Dawhite, Gary Bokoe, George Torpey, The Hitman
 Mixing – The Movement (tracks: 1, 2, 4)
 Music – Dakota O'Neil, Dawhite, George Torpey, The Hitman
 Photography – A. Jansen
 Producer –  The Movement
 Rap  – Gary Bokoe
 Vocals – Linda Meek

Charts

Release history

References

External links
 

1994 singles
1994 songs
Blow Up singles
Maxx songs
Pulse 8 singles
Songs written by Jürgen Wind